Walter mac Thomas Bourke, 3rd Mac William Iochtar or Mac William Bourke, died 1440.

Family background

A son of Thomas mac Edmond Albanach de Burca.

Annalistic references

From the Annals of the Four Masters:
 
 M1401 (sic). Thomas, the son of Sir Edmond Albanagh Burke, i.e. Mac William, Lord of the English of Connaught, died, after the victory of penance. After the death of this Thomas Burke, two Mac Williams were made, namely, Ulick, the son of Richard Oge, who was elected the Mac William; and Walter, the son of Thomas, who was made another Mac William, but yielded submission to Mac William of Clanrickard for his seniority.

References
 The History of Mayo, Hubert T. Knox, pp. 398–402, 1908.

External links

 http://www.ucc.ie/celt/published/T100005D/

13th-century Irish people
People from County Mayo